Pallavi Raju is a South Indian actress, based in Bangalore and primarily working in the Kannada Film.

Early life and education
Pallavi Raju was born in Bangalore, Karnataka, India. She did her schooling from Bangalore and completed her graduation from Bangalore University. She was a sports person in school and college, a state level runner and high jump player. She joined theatre called Misfit and completed acting course.

Career
Pallavi Raju made her acting debut with the Kannada film "KA", she played a nurse, from a Muslim family. Second, Mantram she played a character of a school teacher who will be possessed by a ghost who was her student.

In 2019 she appeared in Ravi History. In the same year she played a pivotal role in a Kannada film Ratnamanjarii.

Filmography

References

1991 births
Living people
Actresses in Malayalam cinema